The Thai National Road Championships are held annually to decide the cycling champions in both the road race and time trial discipline, across various categories.

Road Race

Time trial

Women

References

National road cycling championships
Cycle races in Thailand